State Highway 15 (SH 15) is a state highway in the U.S. state of Texas.

Route description 

SH 15 begins at an intersection with US 54 in Stratford.  It travels eastward through the far northern reaches of the Texas Panhandle, mainly through farmlands. The route passes through the towns of Spearman and Perryton, before exiting eastward into Northwest Oklahoma, where the road transitions to Oklahoma State Highway 15.

History
On October 26, 1954, SH 117 was redesignated as SH 15 for its entire route from the Texas/Oklahoma state line in Lipscomb County through the northeast Panhandle to an intersection with U.S. Highway 287 at Claude.  The route was renumbered to correspond to the connecting Oklahoma State Highway 15. On September 1, 1965, the section from Spearman southward was redesignated as SH 207, while SH 15 was rerouted westward to Stratford over cancelled routes SH 282 and FM 289.

Previous route

SH 15 was one of the original twenty five state highways proposed on June 21, 1917, overlaid on top of the Dallas-Louisiana Highway. From 1917 the routing mostly followed present day U.S. Highway 80 from Dallas to Wills Point.  It continued on, routed along present day SH 64 from Wills Point into Tyler and up U.S. Highway 271 into Gladewater, and east along US 80 into Longview. On June 17, 1918, the section of SH 15 from Gladewater to Longview was transferred to SH 11. On January 21, 1919, an alternate route of SH 15 was designated east of Wills Point, going through Mineola to Gladewater, via US 80.

On November 27, 1922, the section of SH 15 from Wills Point to Tyler was redesignated as SH 15A, which extended to Carthage. The section of SH 15 from Tyler to Gladewater was transferred to an extended SH 31. On August 21, 1923, SH 15A was renumbered as SH 64. On October 26, 1925, SH 15A was designated from Gladewater to Kilgore. On March 19, 1930, this became part of SH 135. On September 18, 1929, another SH 15A was designated along the Scyene Road from SH 15 to SH 14. This highway was erroneously omitted on the March 19, 1930 log, so was unnumbered that day. On November 30, 1932, the former SH 15A was added to the state highway log, but was renumbered as SH 183.

SH 15 was extended east to the Louisiana border on August 21, 1923, replacing a section of SH 11.
In 1926, U.S. Highway 80 was routed over SH 15.  The routes were marked concurrently. On December 16, 1929, SH 15 extended west to Fort Worth. On June 24, 1931, this extension to Fort Worth was cancelled. On September 11, 1934, SH 15 extended west back to Fort Worth. On August 8, 1935, SH 15 was extended west via Albany via Seminole to the Texas-New Mexico boundary, replacing SH 83 and part of SH 1A, though this was not effective until September 1, 1935. On September 26, 1939, the section of SH 15 east of Albany was deleted (already part of US 80 and US 80 Alternate). The remainder of SH 15 was redesignated as US 180 on September 6, 1943.

Major intersections

References

015
Transportation in Sherman County, Texas
Transportation in Hansford County, Texas
Transportation in Ochiltree County, Texas
Transportation in Lipscomb County, Texas
U.S. Route 80